Škrbina is a village in the Municipality of Komen in the Littoral region of Slovenia next to the border with Italy.

Church

The parish church in the settlement is dedicated to Saint Anthony the Hermit and belongs to the Diocese of Koper.

Gallery

References

External links

Škrbina on Geopedia

Populated places in the Municipality of Komen